Hanover Street is a 1979 American-British war and romantic film, written and directed by Peter Hyams, and starring Harrison Ford, Lesley-Anne Down and Christopher Plummer.

Plot

In London during the Second World War, Lieutenant David Halloran, an American B-25 bomber pilot with the Eighth Air Force based in England, and Margaret Sellinger, an English nurse, meet on Hanover Street in a chance encounter.

The following day, Halloran's squadron is sent to bomb Rouen. The plane's starboard engine is hit, but the fire is put out. Cimino, the bombardier, begs Halloran to let him drop the bombs early and turn back, but Halloran does not care about the danger and orders him to wait until they are over the target, prompting him to angrily exclaim that he hates Halloran.

Halloran and Sellinger meet again two weeks later in a secret assignation on Hanover Street. Although she is married, they rapidly fall in love. She tries to resist, but is drawn to the charismatic American. By contrast her husband Paul Sellinger is, by his own description, suave, pleasant, but fairly dull. A former teacher, he is now a trusted member of British intelligence.

During the next few missions, Halloran orders Cimino to drop the bombs early, as he is scared of death because he now has "a reason to live", much to anger and disappointment of Hyer, the co-pilot. Weeks later, before take-off, Halloran hears something odd in the engine and turns back, forcing Patman to go in his place. That night, it's revealed that Patman's plane was hit in the bomb bay with the bombs still on the plane, killing all on board, and that if it hadn't been for that engine, it would've been Halloran.

Ashamed of his actions, Halloran volunteers for an undercover mission in Nazi-occupied France to deliver a British agent. At the last moment, Paul Sellinger takes the place of the agent, and himself joins the mission. His reasons are initially unclear, but he slowly reveals that he wants to prove himself.

Flying over France, the aircraft is hit and the crew is killed except for Halloran and Sellinger. In occupied France, the two have to work together after Sellinger injures his ankle. Sellinger's mission is to proceed to the German headquarters in Lyon and, posing as an SS officer, photograph an important document that lists the German double-agents in British intelligence. Halloran agrees to help Sellinger. Making contact with a local farmer's daughter in the French Resistance, they disguise themselves as German SS officers and photograph the documents using Sellinger's fluency in German (though, despite speaking convincing subtitled German, Plummer's Sellinger consistently states his own rank using Wehrmacht, not SS, terminology) to fool the SS. SS troops raise the alarm when Halloran makes the incorrect response to a question in German, but the pair manage to escape after a lengthy motorycle chase, and make it back to the farm where they had received assistance earlier. However, the farm owner, the father of the collaborating woman,betrays them and they are forced to flee again; though pursued by hundreds of Nazi troops, they successfully escape when they are assisted by the French Resistance. Sellinger, however, is badly injured.

In London, Sellinger's wife finds out that Halloran and Sellinger are together and have come back home, with her husband wounded but alive. Going to visit him in the hospital on Hanover Street, she meets Lieutenant Halloran for the last time. They embrace and kiss, and he tells her that he loves her "enough to let her go", she goes in to see her husband as he goes back out into Hanover Street, where the love story had begun.

Cast

 Harrison Ford as Lt. David Halloran
 Lesley-Anne Down  as Margaret Sellinger
 Christopher Plummer as Paul Sellinger
 Alec McCowen as Maj. Trumbo  Marty Lynch
 Michael Sacks as 2nd Lt. Martin Hyer (Halloran's co-pilot)
 Richard Masur as 2nd Lt. Jerry Cimino (Halloran's bombardier/navigator)
 John Ratzenberger as Sgt. John Lucas (Halloran's engineer/turret gunner)
 Jay Benedict as Cpl. Daniel Giler (Halloran's radio operator/waist gunner)
 Eric Stine as Farrell (Halloran's tail gunner)
 Patsy Kensit as Sarah Sellinger
 Max Wall as Harry Pike
 Shane Rimmer as Col. Ronald Bart
 Sherrie Hewson as Phyllis
 Jeff Hawke as Patman (cameo)

Production

Development
Peter Hyams' career was in a slump after the failure of Peeper (1975). He wrote the script for Telefon but was not able to direct it. He then wrote Hanover Street and said "that was a script that got a lot of attention and people wanted. I was offered an absolute fortune to sell the script but not direct it. I was running out of money and I had a wife and two babies." Hyams said his wife told him "if you sell that script I'm going to leave you," so he decided not to sell the script. The success of Capricorn One enabled Hyams to direct Hanover Street. Finance was provided by General Cinema.

The film was said to have been inspired by the 1940 film Waterloo Bridge and "other pix of that ilk."

Casting
Kris Kristofferson was cast as the male lead in the film and Genevieve Bujold as the female lead. Kristofferson was intrigued by the aerial sequences he had read in the script, as he had served as a helicopter pilot with the 82nd Airborne Division of the U.S. Army for five years. Bujold wanted to make the film because it was a love story; she also related to the subject matter of a married woman falling in love while married, because that had happened to her in real life. Christopher Plummer signed to play the third lead.

However, Kristofferson dropped out of the film. Harrison Ford, in Europe working on Force 10 from Navarone with Robert Shaw, was persuaded to take the lead role.

When Kristofferson dropped out, Bujold decided to leave the film as well. She was replaced by Lesley Anne Down. Down said she read the script quickly and only her part. "I expected it to be sweet, sickly and over the top and it was," she later said of the film.

Historical accuracy
Although United States Army Air Forces North American B-25 Mitchell bombers were featured prominently in Hanover Street, the aircraft was a rare sight in England during World War II, except in squadrons allocated to the RAF's 2nd Tactical Air Force on strikes into Occupied France in company with the de Havilland Mosquito prior to, and after, D-Day.  The typical light bomber in use by the 9th US Air Force based in England was the Martin B-26 Marauder, but the film-makers were forced to use the B-25 due to the few B-26 Marauders in existence.

In the film, Margaret Sellinger emerges from a Piccadilly line tube station called "Hanover Street". In reality there was no such station and, since Hanover Street links upper Regent Street and Brook Street; this would not, in any case, match the alignment of the Piccadilly line, unless there were a fictitious spur similar to that which ran from Holborn to Aldwych from 1907 to 1994.

Aircraft

The aerial sequences were mostly filmed at the by then-disused Bovingdon airfield using five North American B-25 Mitchell bombers flown over to England from USA specially for the filming. Scenes showing the B25s flying through flak on the bombing run were filmed at Little Rissington, the simulated flak bursts being provided by current British AA gunners.

Filming
Ford said he accepted the role "because I had never played a love scene in all my years in the movies. I thought that the part would help me grow, but I hated making that film from start to finish." He said he "never saw" the film. "They wanted me to promote it but they wouldn't show it to me and I'd never pay to see it. It was a terrible experience."

Reception

Box office
The film earned $1.5 million in the U.S. in 1979 and was considered a box-office failure.

Critical reception
Hanover Street received decidedly mixed reviews from critics. Vincent Canby referred to that fame in his review:

Every now and then a film comes along of such painstaking, overripe foolishness that it breaks through the garbage barrier to become one of those rare movies you rush to see for laughs. What Peter Hyams has achieved with Hanover Street, his new film about a wartime romance set in the London of 1943, is a movie that is almost as funny as Woody Allen's What's Up, Tiger Lily? which, if you remember, was a straight-faced Japanese spy picture that Woody took over and dubbed with a hilariously knuckle-brained English language soundtrack. The clichés were everywhere, but always just slightly out of place and inappropriate. This pretty much describes the unfortunate method of Hanover Street, which looks as if Mr. Hyams had studied every popular romantic drama, from A Farewell to Arms to Love Affair and Love Story, and then, when he left the screening room, had been hit on the head with a brick. ... [Ford's] more of a comic-strip character here than he was in Star Wars, which was a live-action cartoon.

Variety wrote that the film is "reasonably effective as a war film with a love story background. Unfortunately it's meant to be a love story set against a war background." It also notes:
"Down again distinguishes herself in a role that doesn't seem up to her standards, while Ford back in the pilot's seat again projects an earnest, if dull, presence. Rest of the cast is under-utilized. John Barry has contributed a score that evokes Douglas Sirk's glossy tearjerkers of the 1950s." Film reviewer Leonard Maltin had a similar critique, calling Hanover Street, "slick, but contrived and unconvincing."

The film has developed a following among film fans and aviation enthusiasts due to the flying sequences.

Awards
Patsy Kensit was nominated for, but did not win, the Best Juvenile Actress in a Motion Picture award for 1980 from Young Artists Awards.

Related Films
The love triangle in Hanover Street is similar to that of the film Hell Boats (1970) starring James Franciscus, which was produced nine years earlier.

Notes

References

Bibliography
 Calvert, Dennis. "The Mitchells of Hanover Street."  Air Progress Aviation, Volume 7, No. 1, Spring 1983.
 Carlson, Mark. Flying on Film: A Century of Aviation in the Movies, 1912–2012. Duncan, Oklahoma: BearManor Media, 2012. .
 Donald, David, ed. American Warplanes of World War II. London: Aerospace Publishing, 1995. .
 Jenkins, Gary. Harrison Ford: Imperfect Hero. New York: Citadel, 1998. .
 Maltin, Leonard. Leonard Maltin's Movie Guide 2009. New York: New American Library, 2009 (originally published as TV Movies, then Leonard Maltin's Movie & Video Guide), First edition 1969, published annually since 1988. .

External links
 
 
 
 
 SoundtrackCollector: Hanover Street
 Mitchell's Do Fly In IMC

British war drama films
British aviation films
American war drama films
American aviation films
1979 romantic drama films
American World War II films
British World War II films
Films shot at EMI-Elstree Studios
Columbia Pictures films
Films set in London
Films about shot-down aviators
Films directed by Peter Hyams
Films about the United States Army Air Forces
1979 films
1970s English-language films
Films scored by John Barry (composer)
British romantic drama films
American romantic drama films
Films with screenplays by Peter Hyams
1970s American films
1970s British films